Below is a list of notable men's and women's artistic gymnastics international events scheduled to be held in 2023 as well as the medalists.

Retirements

Nationality changes

Calendar of events

Medalists

Women

International

Major events

World Cup series

Men

International

Major events

World Cup series

References

Artistic
Artistic gymnastics
Gymnastics by year
2023 sport-related lists